Karin Miller (born December 10, 1977) is a former professional tennis player from the United States.

Biography

Early life
Born in Trenton, New Jersey, Miller grew up in the Hamilton Square section of Hamilton Township, Mercer County. She was coached by her father Russell growing up. The family moved to Florida in 1985, so Miller could attend the Bollettieri Academy. Small in stature, she stood at five foot one.

Tennis career
Miller, a right-handed baseliner, attended Duke University as a freshman, before turning professional in 1997.

She made her Grand Slam main-draw debut at the 1998 Wimbledon Championships as a lucky loser from qualifying, losing her first-round match to Naoko Kijimuta in three sets. Having reached her career best ranking of world No. 100 following Wimbledon, she made it directly into the main draws of the 1998 US Open and 1999 Australian Open.

At an ITF tournament in Bradenton in 2001, she had a win over a young Maria Sharapova.

She won nine ITF singles titles during her career, which ended in 2002.

Settling in Florida, she is the head tennis pro at the Boca Grande Club.

ITF finals

Singles (7–1)

Doubles (2–7)

References

External links
 
 

1977 births
Living people
American female tennis players
Duke Blue Devils women's tennis players
People from Hamilton Township, Mercer County, New Jersey
Tennis people from New Jersey
Sportspeople from Trenton, New Jersey